James Claude "Jim" Thomson Jr. (b.  Princeton, New Jersey, September 14, 1931 d. August 11, 2002) was an American historian and journalist who served in the government, taught at Harvard and Boston Universities, served as curator of the Neiman Foundation for Journalism.

Early life
Born in Princeton, New Jersey when his parents were on home leave from China, where his father taught chemistry at Nanking University. He spent most of his youth in Nanjing. In Nanjing, his mother was neighbor and good friend of Pearl S. Buck, whom he called "Aunt Pearl." His siblings were Anne (Nancy), Sydney, and John, and he was a friend and brother in law to theologian Robert McAfee Brown, Sydney's husband.

Thomson returned to the United States to become a student at Lawrenceville School. He returned briefly to China to travel with a friend, Winthrop Knowlton, in the summer of 1948, when Mao Zedong's revolution was gathering force.  In 1953 he graduated with a B.A. from Yale University, where he was editor of the Yale Daily News and elected to Phi Beta Kappa. As a Yale-Clare Fellow at Cambridge University, he received a B.A. in history in 1955, and an M.A. in 1959. He received his Ph.D. in history from Harvard University in 1961 under the direction of John K. Fairbank. He married Diana Butler in 1959.

Career in politics and scholarship
As a member of the Democratic Party, Thomson was an assistant to Senator Chester Bowles of Connecticut during the Adlai Stevenson presidential campaign of 1956. Bowles invited Thomson to be his advisor when he joined the Kennedy administration. In the Johnson administrations Thomson was  China specialist on the staff of the National Security Council headed by McGeorge Bundy. In May 1964 he was involved in drafting what would eventually become the Gulf of Tonkin Resolution.  He later called the original idea "fairly benign," yet it was shelved in June of that year due to the threat of a congressional filibuster. In 1966 he resigned in protest of the Vietnam War.

He then became a lecturer in history at Harvard University, and taught a popular undergraduate course in American-East Asian Relations. In 1972 he was appointed curator of Harvard's  Nieman Foundation for Journalism. He then taught at Boston University from 1984 until 1997.

He continued to publish both academic and journalistic work. His article "How Could Vietnam Happen?" in the April 1968 Atlantic Magazine examined and condemned American involvement in Vietnam in terms of State Department bureaucratic politics, the purging of expertise in the McCarthy era, and Democratic administration remembrance of the "loss of China" charges. Thomson's doctoral dissertation, finished while he was serving in Washington, was published in 1969 by Harvard University Press, While China Faced West: American Reformers in Nationalist China, 1928-1937. The book describes the efforts of American oriented reformers to provide China with effective political and social change, especially the Rural Reconstruction Movement. After his return to Cambridge, he supported the efforts of John Fairbank and others to form the Committee on American-East Asian Relations under the aegis of the American Historical Association. He and Ernest May edited American-East Asian Relations: A Survey. (Cambridge: Harvard University Press,  1972), a series of essays from a conference in Cuernavaca, Mexico, which assessed the state of the field of American relations with Asia. In 1981, he co-wrote Sentimental Imperialists: The American Experience in East Asia, with Peter W. Stanley and John Curtis Perry. Thomson drew upon this youthful acquaintance in writing  "Pearl S. Buck and the American Quest for China" for a conference celebrating Buck's centennial. In it, he describes Buck as the most influential writer on China since Marco Polo

His death in 2002, two years after his wife's, was due to a heart attack. Both of their funerals were held in the Memorial Church of Harvard University, and they are both buried in Heath, Massachusetts.

References

1931 births
2002 deaths
American male journalists
Alumni of the University of Cambridge
American anti–Vietnam War activists
Historians of Asia
20th-century American historians
American male non-fiction writers
People from Princeton, New Jersey
Yale University alumni
Harvard University faculty
Harvard University alumni
Children of American missionaries in China
Historians from New Jersey
20th-century American male writers